The Custos Rotulorum of King's County was the highest civil officer in King's County, Ireland (now County Offaly). The position was later combined with that of Lord Lieutenant of King's County.

Incumbents

1687–? Robert Grace 
1761–1764 Charles Moore, 1st Earl of Charleville
1766–1822 Charles Moore, 6th Earl of Drogheda
1828–1841 Lawrence Parsons, 2nd Earl of Rosse

For later custodes rotulorum, see Lord Lieutenant of King's County

References

King's County